Iuka is an unincorporated community in Atascosa County, in the U.S. state of Texas. It is located within the San Antonio metropolitan area.

History
A post office was established at Iuka in 1886 and remained in operation until 1908 and served as the main post office for another unincorporated community named Sand Branch. There are no population estimates available for the community. It had a few gravel pits and several scattered houses in the 1940s, which has since decreased while it was listed on county maps in the late 1980s.

Geography

Education
Iuka is served by the Poteet Independent School District.

References

Unincorporated communities in Atascosa County, Texas
Unincorporated communities in Texas